The 2021–22 Croatian First Futsal League (also known as Prva hrvatska malonogometna liga or Prva HMNL) is the 31st season of the Croatian First Futsal League, the national championship for men's futsal teams in Croatia, since its establishment in 1992. The season started on 1 October 2021 with first round od league and ended on 29 May 2022 with fourth game of finals.

Competition system 
The competition takes place in two parts.

First part: Double round robin league with ten clubs playing total of 18 rounds. After end of first part top eight teams goes to playoffs while the last one is relegated and ninth goes to promotion/relegation playoff with the winner of three groups of the Second Croatian futsal league.

Second part: Playoffs in which eight best placed clubs play after the first part of the competition. The quarter-finals and semi-finals are played on two won matches, and the finals on three won matches. During the playoffs in the quarter-finals, semi-finals and finals, the better placed club from the first part of the championship retains the right to host in the first, third and eventual fifth game. Playoff match pairs are determined according to the following schedule:

Quarter-finals: 1st against 8th, 2nd against 7th, 3rd against 6th and 4th against 5th;

Semi-finals: winner of quarterfinal match 1 against  winner of quarterfinal match 4 and winner of quarterfinal match 2 against winner of quarterfinal of match 3; 

Finale: winner of semifinal match 1 against winner of semifinal match 2.

Teams

Changes 
Futsal Pula and Šibenik 1983 were promoted to the Prva HMNL after finishing on top two places in qualifications. Osijek Kelme was relegated finishing last in the Prva HMNL, while Uspinjača was eliminated in qualification.

Club locations

League table

Results 
Each team plays home-and-away against every other team in the league, for a total of 18 matches each played.

Playoff

Quarter-finals 

Olmissum wins 2–0 overall.

Futsal Pula wins 2–0 overall.

Square wins 2–1 overall.

Novo Vrijeme wins 2–0 overall.

Semi-finals 

Novo Vrijeme wins 2–1 overall.

Futsal Pula wins 2–0 overall.

Final 

Novo Vrijeme wins 3–1 overall.

Promotion/relegation playoff

League table

Results 
Each team plays home-and-away against every other team in the league, for a total of 6 matches each played.

Statistics

Top goalscorers

References 

2021 in futsal
Futsal competitions in Croatia